The New Green Consumer Guide is a book written by Julia Hailes on green consumerism. The guide explores how one can consume goods and services in an environmentally friendly manner. Topics discussed include travel, transport, food and drink, home and garden, fashion and cosmetics.

The New Green Consumer Guide was published in 2007 as a successor to The Green Consumer Guide, which Hailes co-authored. First published in 1988, The Green Consumer Guide, in its various editions, has sold in excess of one million copies globally. In the first few weeks after it had been published, there were eleven print runs for The Green Consumer Guide.

References

External links
 Can green consumers save the world? - debate with author at The Daily Telegraph

2007 in the environment
Environmental non-fiction books